CKKX-FM is a Canadian radio station that broadcasts a CHR/Top 40 format at 106.1 FM in Peace River, Alberta and has rebroadcasters in High Level, Fairview, High Prairie, and Manning. The station is branded as Kix FM and is owned by Peace River Broadcasting.

The station received approval by the Canadian Radio-television and Telecommunications Commission (CRTC) in 1997.

Rebroadcasters

References

External links
Kix FM
 
 

Radio stations in Alberta
Hot adult contemporary radio stations in Canada
Year of establishment missing
Radio stations established in 1997
1997 establishments in Alberta
Peace River Country